Croatian Music Institute (HGZ) is the oldest music institution in Croatia. Also, after the Vatroslav Lisinski Concert Hall, it is the second most important concert hall in Zagreb.

It was founded in 1827 under title of "Musikverein" and has had different purposes through the years: organizing concerts in its concert hall, founding a music school (today the Zagreb Academy of Music), publishing the works of Croatian composers etc.

The concert hall is serving mainly for solo and chamber music concerts and is known for its outstandingly rich acoustic. Some of the most famous artists that have performed there are: Franz Liszt, Sviatoslav Richter, David Oistrakh, Mstislav Rostropovich and many others.

Croatian Music Institute presidents 
 Franjo Gašparić, (1886 - 1890)
 Vladislav Cuculić, (1890 - 1892)
 Julije Drohobeczky, (1893 - 1919)
 Robert Siebenschein, (1919 - 1929)
 Antun Goglia, (1929 - 1946)
 Ivo Tijardović, (1946 - 1952)
 Milan Žepić, (1952 - 1976)
 Stjepko Humel, (1976 - 1991)
 Andre Mohorovičić, (1991 - 2002)
 Marcel Bačić, (2002 - 2018)
 Niko Đurić, (2018)
 Romana Matanovac Vučković, (2018 -)

References

External links
 
Lonely Planet

Music organizations based in Croatia
Organizations established in 1827
Music in Zagreb
1827 establishments in the Austrian Empire